The Battle of Alau was fought in Alau, Parsa District on  28 July 1847. It was fought between the armies of King Rajendra and Jung Bahadur Rana and in this confrontation, Jung Bahadur's army won against Rajendra's army and arrested King Rajendra.

After the Bhandarkhal Parva, King Rajendra went to Kashi with the queen. In this period, Jung Bahadur dethroned King Rajendra and replaced him with prince Surendra. Rajendra, then, started plotting the removal of Jung Bahadur with his consultants. However, Jung Bahadur was aware of this conspiracy because he had sent his spies with King Rajendra to Kashi. As a result, King Rajendra's army was slaughtered in Alau and he was then put under arrest. This event is popularly known as 'Alau Parva' in Nepal.

See also
 List of massacres in Nepal

References 

1847 in Nepal
July 1847 events
Wars involving Nepal
Conflicts in 1847
Rana dynasty
Jung Bahadur Rana
Parsa District
History of Madhesh Province